James Yana Kalau was Governor of Bauchi State, Nigeria, from December 1993 to September 1994 during the military regime of General Sani Abacha.
He achieved little, in part handicapped by crippling fuel shortages.

References

Possibly living people
Governors of Bauchi State
Year of birth missing